Sclerolaena divaricata, the tangled copper-burr, is a species of flowering plant in the family Amaranthaceae, native to southeastern Australia. A rounded perennial shrub, it has terete leaves.

References

divaricata
Endemic flora of Australia
Flora of South Australia
Flora of New South Wales
Plants described in 1815